The Dutch West Indies campaign was a series of minor conflicts in 1781 and 1782, in the Fourth Anglo-Dutch War and the American Revolutionary War. Following Great Britain's declaration of war on the Dutch Republic in December 1780, British Admiral George Brydges Rodney, the commander of the Royal Navy in the West Indies, was notified by a fast-sailing packet ship of the declaration.  He immediately acted to ensure control over as many of the Dutch colonies as possible, capturing Sint Eustatius, a vital entrepot of French and Dutch trade between their colonies and Europe, in early February 1781.  He also captured Saba and Sint Maarten, and orchestrated the capture of the Dutch colonial outposts of Berbice, Demerara, and Essequibo in South America.  A planned expedition by Samuel Hood against Curaçao was called off on rumors that a French fleet was approaching. A French expedition in 1782 captured Demerara and Essequibo, although the fate of the other colonies were settled at the conclusion of the war.

References

Koch, Cristopher. The Revolutions Of Europe Being An Historical View Of The European Nations From The Subversion Of The Roman Empire In The West, To The Abdication Of Napoleon # Whittaker Ave Maria Lane Publishing (1839)
ASIN B0011HSJG8

Marley, David. Wars of the Americas: a chronology of armed conflict in the New World, 1492 to the present
Rodway, James. History of British Guiana, Volume 1

Conflicts in 1781
Conflicts in 1782
Dutch West Indies
Dutch West Indies
Battles involving Great Britain
Battles involving France
Battles involving the Netherlands
18th century in the Caribbean
1781 in the Caribbean
1782 in the Caribbean
1781 in the British Empire
1782 in the British Empire